James Douglas Cran (born 28 January 1944) is a British former Conservative Party politician. He was the Member of Parliament (MP) for Beverley (1987–1997) and for Beverley and Holderness (1997–2005).

Early life
He went to Ruthrieston School in Aberdeen and became the school's 1959 Dux Medallion winner. He studied at the University of Aberdeen, gaining an Honours MA. He was the National Winner of the 1968 Daily Mirror Speaking Trophy.

He was a researcher in Conservative Research Department during 1970–71 and was a member of the Leader of the Opposition's (Edward Heath) Briefing Team during the 1970 General Election. From 1971 to 1979, he was the Secretary and Chief Executive of the National Association of Pension Funds. He was the CBI's Northern Director from 1979 to 1984 and the CBI's West Midlands Director from 1984 to 1987. From 1974 to 1979, he was a councillor in the London Borough of Sutton, and served as Chairman of the Health and Housing Committee.

Parliamentary career
Cran became MP for Beverley in 1987 taking over from Sir Patrick Wall. In 1997 he transferred to the constituency of Beverley and Holderness.

He was a member of the '92 Group of right-wing Conservative MPs and took an active part in the leadership contests involving John Major (June 1995), Michael Howard (1997) and the latter stages of William Hague's campaign (1997).

He was a consistent opponent of the Maastricht Treaty and therefore of the single currency and closer European integration.

He was also Parliamentary Private Secretary to the Secretary of State for Northern Ireland (1995–96). He was also present with the Secretary of State in Washington DC at the first meeting with Gerry Adams, then President of Sinn Féin. Cran was also Pairing Whip and then Assistant Chief Whip (1997–2001). He was appointed Shadow Deputy Leader of the House by the then Leader of the Opposition Iain Duncan-Smith but resigned shortly thereafter to pursue other activities. He was a member of a number of Select Committees: Trade and Industry (1987–92); Administration (1997–98); Selection (1998–2001); and Defence (2001–05). He was also a member of the Chairman of Ways and Means Panel (2001–05) and a member of the Council of Europe and the WEU (2001–02).

Other Parliamentary activities included: 
 Vice Chairman, Conservative Backbench Northern Ireland Committee (1992–95)
 Order of St John All Party Group (1994–95)
 Secretary, Conservative Backbench Committee on Constitutional Affairs (1989–91)
 European Affairs (1989–91) 
 All Party Anglo-Malta Group (1992–94) Co-founder
 Parliamentary Group on Occupational Pensions (1992)
 Member, Northern Ireland Grand Committee (1996–2001)
 Treasurer, European Research Group (1994–97)
 Member, '92 Group Steering Committee (2001–04)
 Council Member, Pension Trustees Forum (1992–95)
 Parliamentary Consultant, Lincoln National (UK) Plc (1994–98).

Personal life
He married Penelope Barbara Wilson of South Kensington in 1973. They have one daughter.

References
Who's Who 2005, A&C Black, London, 2005.
Diaries 1987–1992, Edwina Currie MP, 2002, .

External links
They Work For You

1944 births
Living people
Conservative Party (UK) MPs for English constituencies
UK MPs 1987–1992
UK MPs 1992–1997
UK MPs 1997–2001
UK MPs 2001–2005
Politicians from Aberdeen
Alumni of the University of Aberdeen
Scottish Conservative Party politicians
Councillors in the London Borough of Sutton
People educated at Harlaw Academy
British Eurosceptics